Elmer Gantry is a 1960 American drama film about a confidence man and a female evangelist selling religion to small-town America. Adapted by director Richard Brooks, the film is based on the 1927 novel of the same name by Sinclair Lewis, and stars Burt Lancaster, Jean Simmons, Arthur Kennedy, Shirley Jones and Patti Page.

Elmer Gantry was nominated for five Academy Awards in 1961, including Best Picture and Best Score. It won Best Actor for Lancaster, Best Supporting Actress for Jones and Best Adapted Screenplay. Jean Simmons was nominated for the Golden Globe award in the Best Actress in a Motion Picture – Drama category.

The film's plot overlaps with less than 100 pages of the novel Elmer Gantry, deleting many characters and fundamentally changing the character and actions of female evangelist Sister Sharon Falconer, as played by Simmons. The character of Sharon Falconer was loosely based on elements in the career of the Canadian-born American radio evangelist Aimee Semple McPherson, who founded the Pentecostal Christian denomination known as the International Church of the Foursquare Gospel in 1927. In addition, a plot point from the end of the novel is incorporated into Gantry and Lulu Bains's relationship, fundamentally changing the fates of both characters.

Plot
Elmer Gantry is a hard-drinking, fast-talking traveling salesman with a charismatic personality who infuses biblical passages and fervor into his pitches as a way to ease and collect money. He is drawn to the roadshow of Sister Sharon Falconer and is immediately attracted to the revivalist's saintly aura. As the troupe leaves town for Kansas, Gantry sweet talks her naïve assistant Sister Rachel into disclosing information regarding Falconer's past, which he uses to con his way into her good graces. He joins the troupe preaching "Christ in commerce" and how he is a saved salesman.

Gantry and Falconer develop a "good cop/bad cop" routine, with Gantry telling the audience members that they will burn in Hell for their sins and Falconer promising salvation if they repent. Because of Gantry's fire and brimstone sermons, the group comes to the attention of the church council in Zenith, Winnemac, a larger city. Though Falconer's manager Bill Morgan does not think that she is ready to preach outside of the smaller venues, Gantry convinces her to go to Zenith. They meet with the church leaders, most of whom are wary of turning religion into a spectacle as Gantry does, but he convinces them that the churches must earn money to stay open and can increase their membership only if prospective members are first won over to Christ by attending Gantry's colorful revival meetings.

Travelling along with Falconer is big-city reporter Jim Lefferts, who is torn between his disgust for religious hucksterism and his admiration for Gantry's charm and cunning. As Gantry's sermons bring Falconer's group to larger venues, Lefferts writes a series of articles labeling the revival a sham, and reveals that neither Falconer nor Gantry has any credentials. Falconer eventually admits to Gantry that her real name is Katie Jones, and that her origins are humbler than she publicly admits. Falconer also becomes Gantry's lover and loses her virginity to him.

The success of the Falconer-Gantry team comes to the attention of Lulu Bains, who became a prostitute when her youthful affair with Gantry ruined her standing in her minister father's eyes and Gantry ditched her. Acting as a moralist, Gantry unwittingly invades the brothel where Lulu works, but sends the prostitutes out of town when he sees Lulu. When he meets Lulu privately after she phones him, Lulu wants revenge against Gantry for running out on her in Kansas. Her love for Gantry returns, however,  when confronting him, and they embrace. A hidden photographer planted by Lulu records their embrace, but Gantry's love for Falconer prevents him from consummating his relationship with Lulu. Lulu  proceeds to frame Gantry out of jealousy for his love for Falconer. Lulu blackmails him, and Falconer is asked to bring $25,000 in exchange for the negatives of the incriminating pictures. Falconer brings the money, but Lulu refuses to accept it, and the pictures are then printed on the front page of the town's newspaper.

Lulu had at first offered Lefferts the exclusive story of Gantry's supposed sexual indiscretion, but he refused, shrugging off the pictures as merely proof that Gantry is as human as anyone else. An angry mob ransacks the tent revival following the publication of the incriminating photos in another newspaper, with Lulu witnessing Gantry's humiliation. As the mob curses Gantry and smears him with eggs and produce, Lulu is emotionally shaken and flees the scene. She returns to the brothel, which is now in a dilapidated state from Gantry's publicity stunt. Her pimp is there to collect the $25,000, but when Lulu tells him that she did not take Falconer's money, he beats her. Gantry comes to Lulu's rescue. He disposes of the pimp and apologizes to Lulu, who then publicly confesses to having framed Gantry.

Gantry returns to Falconer as a capacity crowd of followers fills her new tabernacle following Gantry's redemption in the press. Falconer declines Gantry's request to abandon her soul-saving ventures, insisting that she and Gantry were brought together by God to do His work. After Falconer appears to cure a follower of deafness, a fire that had been smoldering erupts suddenly. Unable or unwilling to see past her own religious zeal as flames engulf her tabernacle, Falconer remains on the premises and dies. The next day, Gantry, saddened by Falconer's death, leads a spiritual with her followers after their prodding. Morgan asks Gantry to continue Falconer's ministry, but Gantry replies, "When I was a child, I understood as a child and spoke as a child. When I became a man, I put away childish things". His valise in one hand, Bible in the other, and a smile on his face, Gantry strides away.

Cast

 Burt Lancaster as Elmer Gantry
 Jean Simmons as Sister Sharon Falconer
 Arthur Kennedy as Jim Lefferts
 Dean Jagger as William L. Morgan
 Shirley Jones as Lulu Bains
 Patti Page as Sister Rachel
 Edward Andrews as George F. Babbitt (credited as Ed Andrews)
 John McIntire as Rev. John Pengilly
 Hugh Marlowe as Rev. Philip Garrison
 Joe Maross as Pete
 Philip Ober as Rev. Planck
 Barry Kelley as Police Capt. Holt
 Wendell Holmes as Rev. Ulrich
 Dayton Lummis as Eddington, newspaper publisher
 Max Showalter as Deaf Man (uncredited)
 Harry Antrim as salesman in a speakeasy (uncredited)
 Barbara Luna as a prostitute (uncredited)
 Jean Willes as a prostitute (uncredited)
 John Qualen as Sam, a storekeeper (uncredited)

Soundtrack

A remastered and enhanced soundtrack was released on CD on August 25, 1998.

All arrangements are by André Previn.
 "Main Title" (1:45)
 "Long Distance" (1:38)
 "Mr. Babbitt" (3:15)
 "Lulu's Room" (2:49)
 "Do You Believe" (1:55)
 "Not as My Lover" (1:10)
 "Under the Pier" (3:14)
 "Shall We Gather at the River" (1:43)
 "Kiss Me Goodbye" (4:06)
 "Stand Up for Jesus" (1:16)
 "Elmer and Lulu" (1:25)
 "End Title" (1:35)
 "Orchestral Suite" (2:56)
 "Onward Christian Soldiers" (instrumental, 1:25)
 "Shall We Gather at the River" (1:43)
 "Stand Up for Jesus" (1:15)
 "I'm on My Way" (Burt Lancaster – vocal) (2:47)

Reception 
In a contemporary review for The New York Times, critic A. H. Weiler was overwhelmingly positive in his assessment, calling the film "... a living, action-packed, provoking screen study, largely devoid of the novel's polemics, that captures both the eye and mind" and writing: "It is a complex story, running nearly two and a half hours, but its length is hardly noticeable since its many vignettes, each sharply presented, are joined into a theme that somewhat changes Gantry, Sister Falconer, et al. from Lewis' conception but has them shape up as forceful, and often memorable, individuals."

Awards and nominations

See also
 List of American films of 1960

Notes

References

Further reading
 Wheeler Dixon. "Cinematic Adaptations of the Works of Sinclair Lewis." Sinclair Lewis at 100: Papers Presented at a Centennial Conference. Ed. Michael Connaughton. St. Cloud: St. Cloud State University, 1985. 191–200.

External links
 
 
 
 
 
 "Elmer Gantry, a Flawed Preacher for the Ages" at NPR All Things Considered (February 22, 2008).

1960 films
1960 drama films
American drama films
1960s English-language films
Films scored by André Previn
Films about con artists
Films about evangelicalism
Films based on American novels
Films based on works by Sinclair Lewis
Films directed by Richard Brooks
Films featuring a Best Actor Academy Award-winning performance
Films featuring a Best Supporting Actress Academy Award-winning performance
Films featuring a Best Drama Actor Golden Globe winning performance
Films set in Kansas
Films set in the 1920s
Films whose writer won the Best Adapted Screenplay Academy Award
United Artists films
Films produced by Burt Lancaster
1960s American films